The Wombats Proudly Present This Modern Glitch, usually shortened to This Modern Glitch, is the second major studio album by English rock band The Wombats. Released in the UK on 25 April 2011, the album was supported by three singles prior to its release: "Tokyo (Vampires & Wolves)", "Jump into the Fog", "Anti-D". A further three singles were released following release: "Techno Fan", "Our Perfect Disease", and "1996". The Wombats produced the album alongside Rich Costey, Eric Valentine, Butch Walker, and Jacknife Lee. Upon its release, the album received favourable reviews by critics. It has sold 126,772 copies in the UK as of April 2015.

Singles
 "Tokyo (Vampires & Wolves)" is the first single released from the album, it was released on 24 September 2010. It peaked at number 23 on the UK Singles Chart, and also charted at number 33 in Australia as well as number 66 in the Netherlands. It came in at number 8 on Australia's 'Hottest 100' countdown of 2010.
"Jump into the Fog" is the second single released from the album, it was released on 24 January 2011. It peaked at number 35 on the UK Singles Chart and at number 16 on the US Billboard Alternative Songs chart.
"Anti-D" is the third single released from the album, it was released on 11 April 2011. It peaked at number 42 on the UK Singles Chart.
"Techno Fan" is the fourth single released from the album, it was released on 5 June 2011. It peaked at number 60 on the UK Singles Chart.
"Our Perfect Disease" is the fifth single released from the album, it was released on 14 August 2011.
"1996" was the sixth single released from the album on 7 November 2011.

Reception

The album received mixed to favourable reviews, with an aggregated score of 59 from Metacritic. Mark Beaumont of the BBC described the album as 'a flawless modern classic', as well as calling it 'pop album of the year, by at least a dozen choruses'. Matt Collar of AllMusic gave a similarly positive review, saying ' This Modern Glitch finds the gleefully cynical Brit trio delivering a batch of catchy, immediately memorable dance-rock tracks the likes of which haven't been heard since the glory days of Blur'. The Daily Mirror called the album 'triumphant', singling out Anti-D as 'epic'.

Track listing
The official track listing:

Personnel
 Matthew Murphy lead vocals, guitars, keyboards, synthesizers, organ (10), lute (10), omnichord (10), programming, percussion
 Tord Øverland Knudsen bass guitar, synthesizers, keyboards, piano (2), baritone guitar (4, 6), glockenspiel (4), omnichord (5), programming, percussion, backing vocals
 Dan Haggis drums, synthesizers, keyboards, piano (2, 4), organ (4, 5), banjo (10), dulcimer (4), programming, percussion, backing vocals
 Rich Costey programming, percussion
 John Hill programming
 Dave Navarro additional guitar (9)
 Graeme Revell string arrangements and conducting (4, 10)

personnel per Discogs

Charts and certifications

Weekly charts

Year-end charts

Certifications

References

External links 
 This Modern Glitch

2011 albums
The Wombats albums
Albums produced by Butch Walker
Albums produced by Eric Valentine
Albums produced by Jacknife Lee